Albano Sorbelli (Fanano, 2 May 1875- Benedello, 22 March 1944) was an Italian historian, bibliographer and librarian. He was the director of the Biblioteca Comunale of the Archiginnasio of Bologna from 1904 until 1943.

Biografia
A student of Giosuè Carducci and of Pio Carlo Falletti at the University of Bologna, he graduated in Letters and Philosophy in 1898 and later focused on Historical Sciences. In the same University he taught courses on librarianship and bibliography (1925-1944).

Sorbelli was a fundamental figure of the Italian library science. We owe the first prototype of Bologna's library system to him: in 1909 he founded the  Biblioteca Popolare (Popular Library); in 1921, with the opening to the public, the work of reorganisation of the library and archives of the Carducci house were completed.

In 1906 he founded the magazine “The Archiginnasio”; and the series “Library of the Archiginnasio”. He was also promoter of an active cultural activity of the institution that he directed, organising important exhibitions and conferences.

The personal bibliographic assets of Albano Sorbelli were donated, at his death, to the Biblioteca Comunale dell’Archiginnasio. The collection consists of around 13,000 volumes and pamphlets, mainly of literary historical topics, with particular attention to the bibliographic studies and history of the Frignano area, of the University and the city of Bologna.

Partial list of works

 Corpus Chronicorum Bononiensium, in Rerum Italicarum Scriptores (1906ff.)
 
 Opuscoli, stampe alla macchia e fogli volanti... (1830-1855). Saggio di bibliografia storica, Firenze, 1927
 Storia della stampa in Bologna, Bologna, 1929
 Le voci "Bibliografia" e "Bibliologia" nell' Enciclopedia Treccani, 1930
 The second volume of the Storia di Bologna, Bologna, Comune, 1938
 From 1935 until his death he curated the national edition of the works of Giosuè Carducci, edited Zanichelli.

References

External links
 Il Fondo Albano Sorbelli (Biblioteca dell'Archiginnasio)
 Casa Carducci

20th-century Italian historians
Italian bibliographers
Italian librarians
Writers from Bologna
1875 births
1944 deaths